Bracebridge railway station was a freight only station in Bracebridge, Lincolnshire, England situated just south of Lincoln. It was used for goods services.

References

Disused railway goods stations in Great Britain